Hildi district is located in Adamawa state in northern Nigeria. Mararaba Mubi is located within the Hildi region. The area is known for being mountainous. Hildi tribes speak the Margi language. The Margi Hildi is one of the largest Margi-speaking people groups near the mountains.

References

Populated places in Adamawa State